Balaguer Guitars  is an American manufacturer of solid body electric guitars and basses.

History
Joe Balaguer, founder and owner of the company, graduated from the Guitar Craft Academy in 2009, a luthier program within the Musicians Institute. Prior to starting Balaguer Guitars, he repaired and restored vintage instruments in Los Angeles before re-locating back to Pennsylvania.

The company was founded in 2015, following a series of successful prototypes prior to full production. Balaguer Guitars has manufacturing facilities in USA, South Korea, and China.

Instruments 

The company's product range includes the Hyperion, the Helion, the Astra and the Thicket. The Espada is a higher-end range model, retailing around $1099. The company also has a custom shop where players can design specific models.

Notable players 
 Beau Burchell
 Every Time I Die's Andy Williams
 The World Alive's Tony Pizzuti

References

American musical instrument makers